Alexander Augustin Donald MacKenzie (19 February 1876 – 1 July 1969) was Provost of St Andrew's Cathedral, Inverness from 1918 to 1949.

Mackenzie studied theology at Durham University on a scholarship, and was a member of Hatfield College there. As a student he was active in Durham University Boat Club, serving as both Secretary and President by 1903. He also became Senior Man of Hatfield and President of the Durham Union for Epiphany term of 1903. Mackenzie was ordained in 1905.

He began his ecclesiastical career with a curacy at St Mark's Church, Leicester. He was Precentor of Inverness Cathedral from 1911 to 1918 when he became provost.

He died aged 92 in 1969.

Notes

Provosts of Inverness Cathedral
Alumni of Hatfield College, Durham
1876 births
1969 deaths
Durham University Boat Club rowers
Presidents of the Durham Union